The following radio stations broadcast on FM frequency 89.3 MHz:

Argentina

 Alba in Tartagal, Salta
 Alto perfil in Salta 
 Camco in Santa Fe de la Vera Cruz, Santa Fe
 Flash in Villa Constitución, Santa Fe
 Gráfica in Buenos Aires
 La 20 in Pérez, Santa Fe
 La Petrolera in Comodoro Rivadavia, Chubut
 Popular in Rosario, Santa Fe
 La Red San Juan in San Juan
 Manantial LRH 338 in Villa Angela, Chaco
 Máxima in Córdoba
 Puerto Tirol in Puerto Tirol, Chaco
 Radio María in Santa Rosa, La Pampa
 Radio María in Choele–Choel, Río Negro
 Radio María in Reconquista, Santa Fe
 Raíces in Venado Tuerto, Santa Fe
 Sensitive in Buenos Aires
 Sudamericana in Rio Seco, Tucuman

Australia
 2GLF in Sydney, New South Wales
 5GFM in Yorke Peninsula, South Australia
 7LA in Launceston, Tasmania

Brazil
 ZYS 374 in Maués, Amazonas
 ZYS 737 in Candeias, Bahia
 ZYV 527 in Ipiaú, Bahia
 ZYO 460 in Cristalina, Espírito Santo
 ZYL 272 in Ouro Preto, Minas Gerais
 ZYD 690 in Porto Alegre, Rio Grande do Sul

Canada (Channel 207)

 CBGA-10-FM in Gaspe, Quebec
 CBGA-12-FM in Marsoui, Quebec
 CBOD-FM in Maynooth, Ontario
 CBON-FM-20 in Thunder Bay, Ontario
 CBW-1-FM in Winnipeg, Manitoba
 CFVT-FM in Vancouver, British Columbia
 CFWE-FM-2 in Peigan/Blood Reserve, Alberta
 CIBB-FM in Burgeo, Newfoundland and Labrador
 CIBN-FM in Buffalo Narrows, Saskatchewan
 CIJK-FM in Kentville, Nova Scotia
 CIRA-FM-3 in Victoriaville, Quebec
 CISM-FM in Montreal, Quebec
 CIWE-FM in Edmonton, Alberta
 CJLF-FM-2 in Peterborough, Ontario
 CKCM-1-FM in Springdale, Newfoundland and Labrador
 CKGW-FM in Chatham, Ontario
 VF2343 in Logan Lake, British Columbia
 VF2456 in Weyakwin, Saskatchewan
 VF2551 in Armstrong, British Columbia

China 
 CNR Music Radio in Taiyuan
 CNR The Voice of China in Guangzhou and Loudi (during 05:00-01:00 next day)

Indonesia
 Prambors FM in Surabaya, East Java

Malaysia
 Ai FM in Kuala Lumpur
 Lite in Taiping, Perak

Mexico

 XHART-FM in Zacatepec, Morelos
 XHCC-FM in Colima, Colima

 XHCH-FM in Toluca, Estado de México

 XHFA-FM in Chihuahua, Chihuahua
 XHFF-FM in Matehuala, San Luis Potosí
 XHJBC-FM in San Juan Bautista Coixtlahuaca, Oaxaca
 XHKW-FM in Morelia, Michoacán
 XHLLV-FM in Tula, Hidalgo
 XHMIA-FM in Mérida (Kanasin), Yucatán
 XHMON-FM in Monterrey, Nuevo León
 XHNP-FM in Puebla, Puebla
 XHOEX-FM in Texcoco, Estado de México
 XHRRR-FM in Papantla de Olarte, Veracruz
 XHQQQ-FM in Villahermosa (Ixtacomitán), Tabasco

 XHSPS-FM in San Luis Potosí, San Luis Potosí
 XHSRD-FM in Santiago Papasquiaro, Durango
 XHTOT-FM in Pueblo Viejo, Veracruz
 XHUDO-FM in Los Mochis, Sinaloa
 XHZX-FM in Tenosique, Tabasco

Morocco
Med Radio at Agadir

Philippines
 DWWQ-FM in Tuguegarao, Cagayan
 DWIZ-FM in Dagupan
 DWIF in Lucena
 DYYQ in Kalibo
 DYBA in San Carlos, Negros Occidental
 DXKB in Cagayan De Oro
 DXZA in Cotabato
 DXJA in Tandag

Singapore
 Money FM 89.3 in Singapore

United States (Channel 207)

 KAER in Mesquite, Nevada
  in Lake Havasu City, Arizona
  in Mendocino, California
  in Langston, Oklahoma
 KAOS (FM) in Olympia, Washington
 KASB in Bellevue, Washington
  in Anchorage, Alaska
  in Many, Louisiana
  in Fayetteville, Arkansas
 KAZC in Dickson, Oklahoma
  in Rapid City, South Dakota
 KBRZ-FM in Victoria, Texas
  in Lawton, Oklahoma
 KCMP in Northfield, Minnesota
 KCRI in Indio, California
  in Kansas City, Missouri
 KDNG in Durango, Colorado
  in Mesquite, New Mexico
 KEYK in Osage Beach, Missouri
 KHCP in Paris, Texas
 KHEM in Zapata, Texas
 KHLW in Tabor, Iowa
 KIEL in Loyal, Oklahoma
 KIPO (FM) in Honolulu, Hawaii
 KJCF in Asotin, Washington
  in Des Moines, Iowa
 KJPN in Payson, Arizona
 KJTF in North Platte, Nebraska
 KKLK in Savoonga, Alaska
 KKLT in Texarkana, Arkansas
 KKNL in Valentine, Nebraska
  in Steamboat Springs, Colorado
  in Bozeman, Montana
 KLFF in San Luis Obispo, California
 KLGG in Kellogg, Idaho
 KLKR (FM) in Elko, Nevada
  in Billings, Montana
  in Winchester, Oregon
  in Stuart, Oklahoma
 KLRS in Linden, California
  in San Jose, California
 KMVS in Moss Beach, California
  in Prescott, Arizona
  in San Angelo, Texas
 KNDZ in McKinleyville, California
 KNON in Dallas, Texas
 KNPH in Havre, Montana
 KOGL (FM) in Gleneden Beach, Oregon
  in Fremont, California
  in Sebeka, Minnesota
 KPCC in Pasadena, California
 KPDO in Pescadero, California
  in Berkeley, California
  in Greenville, California
  in Agana, Guam
  in North Highlands, California
 KQQN in Nome, Alaska
 KQQS in Sitka, Alaska
 KRSF in Ridgecrest, California
 KRSW in Worthington, Minnesota
 KSBJ in Humble, Texas
 KSSO in Norman, Oklahoma
 KSVQ in Gambell, Alaska
 KTAW in Walsenburg, Colorado
  in Festus, Missouri
 KTDH in Dalhart, Texas
 KTDX in Laramie, Wyoming
 KTHL in Altus, Oklahoma
 KTPD in Del Rio, Texas
  in Bellingham, Washington
  in Grand Forks, North Dakota
  in Moscow, Idaho
 KUOU in Roosevelt, Utah
 KUSL in Richfield, Utah
  in Denver, Colorado
  in Port Angeles, Washington
  in Fresno, California
  in Sisters, Oregon
  in Sheridan, Wyoming
  in Norfolk, Nebraska
 KYAI in McKee, Kentucky
 KYPB in Big Timber, Montana
 KZAO in Ajo, Arizona
  in Lincoln, Nebraska
  in Hattiesburg, Mississippi
 WAJJ in Mckenzie, Tennessee
 WALN in Carrollton, Alabama
 WAMH in Amherst, Massachusetts
 WATU in Port Gibson, Mississippi
  in Winston-Salem, North Carolina
  in Americus, Georgia
  in Orchard Lake, Michigan
 WCDV-LP in Lynn, Massachusetts
 WCOM-FM in Silver Creek, New York
 WCSB in Cleveland, Ohio
  in East Moline, Illinois
 WDWZ in Andalusia, Alabama
  in Folkston, Georgia
 WEQS in Sparta, Wisconsin
 WFJS-FM in Freehold, New Jersey
 WFLJ in Frostproof, Florida
 WFPL in Louisville, Kentucky
  in Paducah, Kentucky
  in Zeeland, Michigan
  in Saint Joseph, Illinois
 WGSS (FM) in Copiague, New York
  in Geneseo, New York
  in Dearborn, Michigan
  in Bangor, Maine
  in Plymouth, Indiana
 WIMV in Owingsville, Kentucky
 WIPA in Pittsfield, Illinois
 WIRC in Ely, Minnesota
  in Allentown, Pennsylvania
  in Indianapolis, Indiana
 WJIK in Fulton, Alabama
  in Spring Arbor, Michigan
  in Culebra, Puerto Rico
  in Saint Catherine, Florida
  in Chicago, Illinois
 WKRT in Richmond, Indiana
  in Wooster, Ohio
  in Greenville, South Carolina
  in Monroe, New York
 WLRH in Huntsville, Alabama
  in Webster, New York
  in Reading, Ohio
  in Crossville, Tennessee
  in Freeport, Maine
 WMWG-LP in Glendale, Wisconsin
  in Bridgeton, New Jersey
 WNJY in Netcong, New Jersey
  in Hopkinsville, Kentucky
 WNPN in Newport, Rhode Island
 WNSS in Palm Coast, Florida
  in Evanston, Illinois
  in Washington, District of Columbia
  in Titusville, Florida
 WPJN in Jemison, Alabama
 WPNE (FM) in Green Bay, Wisconsin
 WPZR in Emporia, Virginia
  in Pittsburgh, Pennsylvania
 WQPH in Shirley, Massachusetts
  in Warminster, Pennsylvania
 WRFE in Chesterfield, South Carolina
 WRFG in Atlanta, Georgia
 WRKF in Baton Rouge, Louisiana
  in Boynton Beach, Florida
 WRPB in Benedicta, Maine
  in Hartford, Connecticut
 WRVH (FM) in Clayton, New York
 WSCI in Charleston, South Carolina
  in Norfolk, Connecticut
 WSHA in South Charleston, West Virginia
 WSHN in Munising, Michigan
  in Binghamton, New York
 WSMB in Harbor Beach, Michigan
 WSOE in Elon, North Carolina
  in Boston, Massachusetts
  in New Bern, North Carolina
 WTLI in Bear Creek Township, Michigan
 WUON in Morris, Illinois
  in Charlottesville, Virginia
 WVWS in Webster Springs, West Virginia
 WXMW in Sycamore, Ohio
  in Chapel Hill, North Carolina
  in Memphis, Tennessee
  in Lima, Ohio
  in Maumee, Ohio
  in Linton, Indiana
 WZCP in Chillicothe, Ohio
  in Newark, Ohio
  in Spring Lake, North Carolina
 WZVK in Glasgow, Kentucky

Vietnam
 ThuDucRadio in Thu Duc, Ho Chi Minh City

References

Lists of radio stations by frequency